Memento mori (Latin: "remember you will die") is a common motif in art.

Memento mori may also refer to:

Anime
 "Memento Mori", Eureka Seven episode
 "Memento Mori", Linebarrels of Iron episode
 "Memento Mori", Negima! episode
 Memento Mori, satellite weapon used by A-Laws in Mobile Suit Gundam 00'''s 2nd season
"Memento Mori", Death Parade episode 11 title
 "Memento Mori", Fairy Tail episode

Film and television
 Memento Mori (film), a 1999 South Korean horror movie
 "Memento Mori" (The X-Files), an episode from season 4 of the TV series The X-Files "Memento Mori", an episode from season 10 of the Stargate SG-1 TV series
 "Memento Mori", a 1992 TV film that was part of the British series Screen Two directed by Jack Clayton
 "Memento Mori", an episode of The Punisher TV series
 "Memento Mori", an episode from season 6 of The 100 TV series
 "Memento Mori", an episode from season 1 of British-Irish period crime drama Miss Scarlet and The Duke
 "Memento Mori", an episode from season 1 of the TV series Star Trek: Strange New Worlds

Games
 Memento Mori (video game)
 Requiem: Memento Mori, online role-playing game

Literature
 Memento Mori (novel), a novel by Muriel Spark
 "Memento Mori" (short story), a short story by Jonathan Nolan and basis for the 2000 film Memento Music 
 Memento Mori (band)
 Memento Mori (Sculthorpe), orchestral composition
 Memento Mori (radio show), a radio show by Canadian musician the Weeknd

Albums
 Memento Mori (The Bastard Fairies album)
 Memento Mori (Buck-Tick album)
 Memento Mori (Depeche Mode album)
 Memento Mori (Flyleaf album)
 Memento Mori (Gemini Syndrome album)
 Memento Mori, an album by Aviv Geffen
 Memento Mori, an EP by High Dependency Unit
Memento Mori (Sahg album)

Songs
 "Memento Mori", from Journey of Souls by Keldian
 "Memento Mori", from Memorial by Moonspell
 "Memento Mori", from Once Only Imagined by The Agonist
 "Memento Mori", from Peace and Noise by Patti Smith
 "Memento Mori", from The Black Halo by Kamelot
 "Memento Mori", from Lamb of God by Lamb of God
 "Memento Mori", from All Our Gods Have Abandoned Us by Architects
 "Memento Mori", from The Hardest Way to Make an Easy Living by The Streets
 "Memento Mori", from Pentecost III by Anathema
 "Hana (Mémento Mori)", by Mr. Children
 "Memento Mori", from Hell Starts With an H by Reaper
 "Memento Mori", from A Chance to Cut Is a Chance to Cure by Matmos
 "Memento Mori: the most important thing in the world", from The Normal Album by Will Wood
"Momento Mori", from Cacophony'' by Rudimentary Peni

See also 
 Memento (disambiguation)